Samarta (Hamarta) is a rural locality (a settlement) in Okinsky District, Republic of Buryatia, Russia. The population was 3 as of 2010. There are 2 streets.

References 

Rural localities in Okinsky District